Örjan (OErjan) is an old Swedish male name originating from the Low German name Jurian or Jurien which is a variant of George. 
The Name Day in Sweden is July 9. The Norwegian version of the name is Ørjan.

The name has been present in Sweden since the Middle Ages as (Yrian). The saint called St George elsewhere in Europe was then called Sankt Örjan or Riddar Örjan (Knight Örjan), (nowadays normally Sankt Göran). The name was very popular at this time. The name evolved during the 16th century to Jöran or Göran, and the original name became uncommon. In the mid 20th century the name had a brief renaissance.

In Sweden there were in total 3147 persons with the firstname Örjan. The name is mainly only used in Sweden and Norway.

In Finland 41 men have been baptised to Örjan during 1920 to 2008.

Variants
Georg
George (English)
Georges (French)
Giorgio (Italian)
Göran/Jöran/Jörgen (Swedish)
Jorge (Spanish)
Yrjö (Finnish)
Ørjan (Norwegian)
Yegor/Jegor/Jegors (Eastern Slavic and Baltic)

Persons with the name Örjan/Ørjan
 Örjan Birgersson, Swedish football player
 Örjan Blomquist, Swedish cross country skier and winner of Vasaloppet
 Örjan Fahlström, Swedish composer
 Örjan Karlsson, bass player in the Swedish boy band The Pinks
 Örjan Kihlström, Swedish coachman
 Ørjan Larsen, Norwegian Esports player
 Örjan Martinsson, Swedish football player
 Örjan Modin, Swedish bandy player
 Ørjan Nilsen, Norwegian music producer
 Örjan Nordling, Swedish prisbelönt typsnittsdesigner
 Ørjan Nyland, Norwegian footballer
 Örjan Örnkloo, Swedish musician and producer
 Örjan Ouchterlony, Swedish professor of bacteriology
 Örjan Persson, Swedish football player
 Örjan Ramberg, Swedish actor
 Örjan Sölvell, Swedish professor

References  

Swedish masculine given names
Norwegian masculine given names